Diarmuid O'Connor (born 1999) is an Irish Gaelic footballer who plays in midfield for Na Gaeil and at senior level for the Kerry county team.

O'Connor won two All-Ireland Minor Football Championship medals in 2016 and 2017, and was an All-Ireland Under-20 Football Championship semi-finalist in 2018. He was part of the team that won the 2022 All-Ireland Senior Football Championship title.

References

1999 births
Living people
Kerry inter-county Gaelic footballers